The Tshimakain Mission started in September 1838, with the arrival of Congregationalist missionaries Cushing and Myra Fairbanks Eells and Elkanah and Mary Richardson Walker to the area along Chamokane Creek at the community of Ford, Washington. Fort Colvile Chief Factor Archibald McDonald recommended the area to Eells and Walker on their first visit to the area.  On April 23, 1838 after traveling to Independence, Missouri, the Eells, Walkers, William Henry and Mary Augusta Gray, Asa B. and Sarah Smith, and Andrew Rodgers, departed for the Oregon County with a Hudson Bay Company fur trader caravan to the Rendezvous. They arrived at Waiilatpu and the Whitman Mission on August 29, 1838.

For the next nine years under the auspices of American Board of Commissioners for Foreign Missions, the Tshimakain missionaries lived with the Spokane people.

On September 16, 1838, Eells conducted the first Protestant service in Stevens County at Chewelah.

In the fall of 1839, the missionaries started a school for the local Indians with 30 students rising to 80 over the winter.

On January 11, 1840, Eells house burned. Local Indians responded quickly to assist.  When the Fort Colvile leader Archibald McDonald heard about the fire, he dispatched four men to make the house habitable.

In 1842, Elkanah Walker, with support from Cushing Eells, printed the Spokane Primer, a Salish language primer.  This was the first book written in Washington.

The winter of 1846-47 was the most severe in the memory of the oldest Indians. It triggered the loss of many domestic animals for Indians and missionaries.

Whitman Massacre impacts Tshimakain Mission

On November 29, 1847, Cayuse Indians massacred the members of the Whitman Mission in Walla Walla. Cushing Eells and Elkanah Walker were supposed to be at the Whitman Mission during the time of the massacre, but Elkanah Walker took ill, and Cushing Eells did not want to leave the families without support. As members of the Oregon Volunteers chased the Indians, it brought them closer to the Tshimakain Mission.  One of the Indians involved in the massacre had family at Fool's Prairie, now Chewelah, to the north of the Tshimakain Mission.  The Chief Factor John Lee Lewes of Hudson Bay Company Fort Colvile offered to house the missionaries up at the fort for their safety. At first they delayed going to the fort as the Spokane People wanted them there and would provide support.  As the chase of the Cayuse Indians involved in the massacre stretched out, they finally sought the safety of the fort.

Colonel Henry A. G. Lee, Oregon Volunteers called for volunteers to bring the Tshimakain missionaries to the Willamette Valley and safety.  Major Joseph Magone with 60 volunteers escorted the Eells and Walker families to Oregon City on June 22, 1848.

Return to Tshimakain
In July 1874, Eells came back to the area, the only one of the four missionaries to do so. The following Sunday, Eells conducted two services for the natives and two more for the white settlers at Chewelah.  Eells consulted with John A. Simms, Indian agent for the area and located at Chewelah. 
In 1892, a church was erected at Chewelah, although Eells was living west of the Cascade Mountains, he came and offered prayer in the new church some 54-years to the day after he first camped on the site. He gifted a bell for this church.  He bought it in New York and paid for it a few days before his death. 

During their time with the Spokane People teaching their faith, they never had a convert to their faith.  But, in the spring of 1873, Spokane Garry invited the Reverend Henry Spalding to visit the area and baptize his people. Spalding baptized 253 adults and 81 children that summer.

Walker's Prairie
The area where the mission was located is called Walker's Prairie to this day in honor of Elkanah and Mary Walker.  The mission was on the main land route from Walla Walla to Colville, the Fort Walla Walla–Fort Colville Military Road ran right in front of their homes.

Notables who visited the mission
Dr. Marcus Whitman came several times to assist Mary Walker and Myra Eells with the births of their children.
Henry H. Spalding, fellow missionary visited several times.
Francis Ermatinger was part of the HBC escort to Rendezvous on the trip west and visited January 1839.
Lieutenant Robert E. Johnson, United States Navy, of the United States Exploring Expedition, visited in June 1841.
Horatio Hall, a member of the United States Exploring Expedition, took a direct route from Walla Walla to the mission arriving September 1841.
Father Pierre-Jean_De_Smet visited in April 1842.
Karl (Charles) A. Geyer, German botanist, visited on December 25, 1844, stayed until August 22, 1845.
Paul Kane, famous for his paintings of Native Peoples, visited in September 1847.

References 

Christian missions in North America
1847 in Oregon Country
Oregon Territory
Pre-statehood history of Washington (state)
Massacres by Native Americans
Cayuse War
Oregon Country

External links
 Cushing Eells collection at the Whitman College and Northwest Archives, Whitman College.